Philippe Val (born 14 September 1952) is a French journalist, singer, and comedian. He was a co-founder of the second iteration of Charlie Hebdo, serving as the satirical political weekly's editor and director. After leaving Charlie Hebdo in 2009, Val was director of the public radio channel France Inter until 2014.

Biography
Val first became known as a member of the comedy team Font et Val with Patrick Font, or sometimes as a one-person show performer, with his dog "Jeff", in the 1970s and 1980s. He is also a singer and pianist. At the turn of the 21st century, he performed with Emmanuel Binet on bass. His last album was called simply Philippe Val.

Charlie Hebdo
In 1991 Val was editor of the satirical political weekly La Grosse Bertha. He was fired in 1992 after clashing with the publisher, who wanted apolitical mischief. With cartoonists Gébé and Cabu (who left La Grosse Bertha in solidarity with Val), and François Cavanna, and Georges Wolinski, he helped relaunch Charlie Hebdo, which had folded in 1981. The new magazine was owned by Val, Gébé, Cabu, and singer Renaud Séchan. Val was editor, and Gébé was artistic director.

In 2004, following the death of Gébé, Val succeeded him as director of Charlie Hebdo, while still holding his position as editor. Several contributors and journalists (Olivier Cyran, Mona Chollet, Philippe Corcuff) protested against Val's ideas and left the magazine, imputing anti-Arab and islamophobic views to him. Val’s editorship of Charlie Hebdo was influenced by three convictions:  philo-Semitism, anti-sociologisme, and an aversion to Islam due to the assumption that anti-Semitism is intrinsic to Arab identity and Islam. As editorial director, Val chose to publish the Danish caricatures of Muhammad in late 2005. As a result of publishing the cartoons, Charlie Hebdo was taken to court for inciting hatred; in 2007 it was acquitted of those charges. Val denounced the dangers of Islamist ideology, calling it a "new totalitarianism"; he dedicated the court victory to all moderate Muslims.

In 2008, Val fired cartoonist Siné from the magazine for an alleged antisemitic comment in one of his columns. However, in December 2010, Siné won a 40,000-euro court judgment against Charlie Hebdo for wrongful termination. In 2009, Val resigned from Charlie Hebdo after being appointed director of France Inter. Val gave away  his shares in Charlie Hebdo in 2011.

Radio
Val has had an opinion slot, first on environmentalism, then on general politics, for various programs on France Inter since the early 1990s. He is a regular guest on the program Le premier pouvoir ("The First Power"), a critique of the media on the radio station France Culture; as well as on I-Télé.

Val says in his Traité de savoir-survivre par temps obscurs that the Jewish people have offered a great deal to mankind.

References

1952 births
Living people
People from Neuilly-sur-Seine
French columnists
French humorists
French journalists
Charlie Hebdo people
French male non-fiction writers